Coleophora asterosella is a moth of the family Coleophoridae. It is found in Canada, including Ontario.

The larvae feed on the leaves of Aster tradescanthi.

References

asterosella
Moths of North America